Vincent Marco Chu Morales (born December 11, 1993), professionally known as Mikoy Morales, is a Filipino actor, model, singer, comedian, and television personality. Along with Ruru Madrid, Zandra Summer and Elle Ramirez, he is a runner-up on Protégé: The Battle For The Big Artista Break.

Morales was a mainstay of gag show Bubble Gang from 2015 until 2022, and is known for his roles in Pepito Manaloto, Sirkus, and Lolong.

Early life

Morales was born on 11th December 1993 in Roxas, the Philippines, as Vincent Marco Chu Morales. Majority of people know him as a television personality who has featured in various television programs and films. 

Although he hasn't disclosed anything about his high school education, he studied Architecture at the University of Santo Tomas. When he decided to venture into the show business, he shifted to another course at Meridian International in McKinley, where he studied Music Business Management.

Career

Mikoys 1st TV show was a reality show called Protégé: A Battle Of Big Artistas in 2012, The reality show it's also similar to GMA 7's sister show longest running reality talent program, StarStruck, Protégé was Mikoy becoming a stardom where he become a finalists while his fellow Co star talent Thea Tolentino was emerged as a reality show champion. 

Mikoys 1st acting on TV was Maynila also aired on GMA Channel 7 in 2012.   

Mikoys 1st comedy sitcom was Pepito Manaloto in 2015 where he plays a gay best friend of fellow Co star Jake Vargas, also in the cast in the sitcom were Barbie Forteza, Jak Roberto, Protégé Champion Thea Tolentino, Angel Satsumi, former That's Entertainment host and former Ober Da Bakod star Manilyn Reynes, former Nuts Entertainment host John Feir, and former Tropang Trumpo mainstay and current Bubble Gang mainstay Michael V, his sitcom until it ended as a season finale last 2021 due to COVID 19 pandemic and replaced by a new season of Pepito Manaloto: Ang Unang Kuwento which replaces a new set of characters are former Kapamilya comedian Pokwang Subong, former Mara Clara star Gladys Reyes, Bubble Gang Mainstay Sef Cadayona & Former Sirkus mainstay Mikee Quintos.

Mikoy also ventures into a kids fantasy program Sirkus with fellow Co star and real life best friends Mikee Quintos which plays as a both twin siblings brother and sister Tandem in a said drama adventure fantasy program in 2018, Mikoy and Mikee were reunited again in a drama series, The Gift with Asia's Multimedia Star and pambansang Bae ng pilipinas, Alden Richards and comedian Jo Berry in 2019.  Mikoy and Mikee reunited once again but this time in a comedy sitcom show, Pepito Manaloto in 2020 & 2021, Mikoy for Ang Tunay Na Kuwento in 2020, while his Co star and best friend Mikee for Ang Unang Kuwento which he plays half gay and also a half straight boy in 2020 which Mikee plays as a younger Elsa played by Manilyn Reynes as an older version of Elsa.

Mikoy will star in a 1st action thriller series, Lolong in 2021 with co star and fellow former Protégé star Ruru Madrid.

Personal life

Mikoy Morales and Thea Tolentino have been in an on-and-off relationship for quite some time now. The two have been together from 2013 to 2018. Although they broke up sometime later in 2018, they did reconcile in 2019.

Filmography

Television

Movies

Awards and nominations

References

External links
 
 Sparkle profile

1993 births
Living people
Visayan people
People from Capiz
Filipino male television actors
Filipino male comedians
Filipino male film actors
Participants in Philippine reality television series
Protégé (TV series) participants
GMA Network personalities